Monifa Jansen (born February 11, 1993)  is a Curaçaoan model and social media influencer who was crowned Miss Curaçao Universe 2011 and represented her country in the Miss World 2011 and Miss Universe 2012 pageants.

Miss Curaçao 2011
Jansen competed as the one of 7 finalists in her country's national pageant, Miss Curaçao Universe, held in April 2011. She won the title, gaining the right to represent Curaçao in Miss Universe 2011.

Miss Universe 2011
Jansen did not take part in Miss Universe 2011 pageant September 12, 2011 because she did not meet the age requirement to participate. Jansen's first runner-up, Evalina van Putten, competed in the pageant in her stead.

Miss World 2011
Since Jansen could not compete in the Miss Universe 2011 pageant she instead competed in the Miss World 2011 pageant in London on November 8, 2011. She placed 108th with a score of 134.

Miss Universe 2012
Jansen competed in the Miss Universe 2012 pageant, but failed to place in the semifinals.

References

External links

1993 births
Living people
Curaçao beauty pageant winners
Miss Universe 2012 contestants
Miss World 2011 delegates
Dutch people of Nigerian descent